Karl Ragnar Lennartsson (20 January 1910 – 8 August 1988) was a Swedish footballer who played for Fritsla, Elfsborg and Gårda. He featured twice for the Sweden national football team in 1939, scoring two goals.

Career statistics

International

International goals
Scores and results list Sweden's goal tally first.

References

1910 births
1988 deaths
Swedish footballers
Sweden international footballers
Association football forwards
IF Elfsborg players
Gårda BK players